North Ronaldsay Lighthouse was built in 1852 on the island of North Ronaldsay in the Orkney Islands, Scotland, 43 years after Dennis Head Old Beacon was deactivated. The old fog siren with notable red trumpet was replaced by an electric diaphragm-type horn. That horn was discontinued in favour of a Tyfon horn consisting of 8 mini-trumpets installed on the building that once housed the fog siren. The Tyfon horn gives three blasts every 60 seconds. The electric beeper horn now lies flat on the ground next to the fog signal building, and is still in service today.

See also

 List of lighthouses in Scotland
 List of Northern Lighthouse Board lighthouses

References

External links
 
 Northern Lighthouse Board site on the history of North Ronaldsay Lighthouse 
 Northern Lighthouse Board

North Ronaldsay
Lighthouses in Orkney
Category B listed lighthouses
Lighthouses completed in 1852
Category B listed buildings in Orkney